The Copyright Arbitration Royalty Panel (CARP) system was a part of the United States Congress involved in making decisions regarding copyright royalties.

Panel function 
The system itself was created upon the suggestion of the Register of Copyrights, and is sanctioned to appoint and organize copyright arbitration royalty panels. The primary purpose of the panel is to make decisions involving the adjustment of copyright royalty rates as well as the terms and payments of royalties that fall under copyright law. 

When determining the reasonable royalty rates, the Copyright Arbitration Royalty Panel attempts to make the creative works accessible to the public, to grant the copyright holder a fair reward for the work, and to minimize any disruptive effects the industries involved or associated with the copyright holder and user.  Additionally, arbitrary decisions are made concerning the adjustment of the copyright royalty rates by this group.

Distribution Reform Act of 2004 
The CARP was phased out by the Copyright Royalty and Distribution Reform Act of 2004, which amended chapter 8 of the U.S. Copyright Act in its entirety. Pub. L. No. 108-419, 118 Stat. 2341. Under the new system, three Copyright Royalty Judges, also known as CRJs, establish the conditions and rates for (compulsory) copyright statutory licenses, and govern the distribution system of royalties collected by the Copyright office on these statutory licenses.  17 U.S.C. Section 801.

The CRJ appointees will serve for a full-time six-year term with the possibility for reappointment. In order to avoid replacing all three judges at the same time, the first three judges appointed will serve staggered terms of two, four, and six years. 17 U.S.C. Section 802.

See also
 Copyright Royalty Board

References

United States Copyright Office
Copyright agencies
Music licensing